Laurea University of Applied Sciences is a university of applied sciences that operates in the region of Uusimaa, in southern Finland. Laurea was established in 1992 with the name Espoo-Vantaa Polytechnic, which was changed to its current form in 2001.

Education at Laurea University of Applied Sciences is based on the Learning by Developing (LbD) operational model. Laurea has approximately 7,800 students and employs approximately 600 personnel. Laurea's six campuses are located in the Greater Helsinki region, in Hyvinkää, Espoo (in Leppävaara and Otaniemi), Lohja, Porvoo and Vantaa. Tuition is available in Finnish and English.

Laurea typically accepts the lowest percentage of applicants, of all universities and other higher education institutions in Finland. In 2020, of the 15,700 applicants, only 1,160 or 7% were admitted.

Student associations
Laureamko : Student union
LaureaES: Student Entrepreneurship Society in Laurea

References

External links
Official website

Universities and colleges in Finland
Educational institutions established in 1992
1992 establishments in Finland